Harvey Paul Johnson (June 22, 1919 – August 8, 1983) was  an American football player and coach. He served two separate stints as the head coach for the Buffalo Bills, first in the American Football League (AFL) and then in the National Football League (NFL). 

Born and raised in Bridgeton, New Jersey, Johnson attended Bridgeton High School and Staunton Military Academy.

Playing career
Johnson played as a linebacker for the New York Yankees of the All-America Football Conference (AAFC) from 1946 to 1949.  In 1951, he played as a linebacker for the NFL's New York Yanks.

Coaching
After eight years as an assistant coach and then defensive coordinator with the Buffalo Bills, Johnson first took the reins as head coach in 1968, when Joe Collier was fired two games into the season. The Bills went 1–10–1 with Johnson at the helm, and he was replaced the following year by John Rauch. Johnson returned to his role as the Bills' defensive backfield coach for two seasons before resuming the head coaching post in 1971. After finishing with a 1–13 record that year, Johnson was reassigned to the scouting department. He compiled a record of 2–23–1 in his two seasons. Johnson was also on the Buffalo Bills coaching staff when the Bills won the 1965 AFL Championship game. Johnson continued to work as a scout for the team until his death in 1983.

It was speculated that Johnson's love of thoroughbred horse racing, a passion he shared with owner Ralph Wilson, allowed him to stay on the Bills payroll despite his poor performance in coaching.

Head coaching record

References

External links
 Johnson's New York Times obituary

1919 births
1983 deaths
Bainbridge Commodores football players
Buffalo Bills coaches
Buffalo Bills scouts
New York Yanks players
New York Yankees (AAFC) players
William & Mary Tribe football players
Bridgeton High School alumni
People from Bridgeton, New Jersey
Sportspeople from Cumberland County, New Jersey
Staunton Military Academy alumni
Players of American football from New Jersey
Buffalo Bills head coaches